Daniel Kerrigan may refer to:

Dan Kerrigan (1843-1880), American pugilist, sportsman, and politician
Danny Kerrigan (born 1982), English footballer